Johnston Community School District (JCSD) is a school district headquartered in Johnston, Iowa.
In 2018, Laura Kacer became the superintendent.

It serves Johnston and portions of Des Moines, Granger, Grimes, and Urbandale. Camp Dodge is in the district boundary.

Schools
Secondary schools:
 Johnston High School
 Johnston Middle School
 Summit Middle School

Elementary schools:
 Beaver Creek Elementary School
 Horizon Elementary School
 Lawson Elementary School
 Timber Ridge Elementary School
 Wallace Elementary School

Preschool:
 Johnston Early Learning Academy

See also
List of school districts in Iowa

References

External links
 Johnston Community School District
School districts in Iowa
Education in Polk County, Iowa
Education in Des Moines, Iowa
Urbandale, Iowa